Charaxes dilutus is a butterfly in the family Nymphalidae. It is found in Uganda, Tanzania, Malawi, the Democratic Republic of the Congo, Zambia and Angola. The habitat consists of tropical evergreen forests.

The larvae feed on Albizia gummifera, Albizia adianthifolia and Scutia species.

Notes on the biology of dilutus are given by  Kielland, J. (1990).

Description
dilutus Rothsch. is somewhat larger [than Charaxes eupale , with the apical half of the forewing light green, less sharply defined proximally and terminating at or before the end of vein 1. Hindwing without dark marginal line and with the submarginal spots smaller or indistinct. In the interior of the Congo region and in Nyassaland.

A full description is given by Walter Rothschild and Karl Jordan, 1900 Novitates Zoologicae Volume 7:287-524.  page 512 (for terms see Novitates Zoologicae Volume 5:545-601 )

Subspecies
Charaxes dilutus dilutus (Malawi, Zambia, eastern Angola, Democratic Republic of Congo, southern and western Tanzania)
Charaxes dilutus amanica Collins, 1990 (north-eastern Tanzania)
Charaxes dilutus kasitu White & Grant, 1989    (Malawi: west-central to the Dzelanyama Range) synonym for Charaxes eupale
Charaxes dilutus ngonga van Someren, 1974. (central Kenya, Uganda: south-west to Kigezi, Sudan) synonym for Charaxes eupale

Similar species
Charaxes dilutus is in the Charaxes eupale species group (clade). The clade members are

Charaxes subornatus
Charaxes eupale
Charaxes dilutus
Charaxes montis
Charaxes minor
Charaxes schiltzei
Charaxes schultzei
Charaxes virescens
Bouyer et al., 2008 erected the genus Viridixes Bouyer & Vingerhoedt, 2008 to accommodate species belonging to the eupale species group.

Realm
Afrotropical realm

References

Victor Gurney Logan Van Someren, 1974 Revisional notes on African Charaxes (Lepidoptera: Nymphalidae). Part IX. Bulletin of the British Museum of Natural History (Entomology) 29 (8):415-487. 
Bouyer, T., Zakharov, E., Rougerie, R. & Vingerhoedt, E. (2008): Les Charaxes du groupe eupale : description d’un nouveau genre, révision et approche génétique (Lepidoptera, Nymphalidae, Charaxinae) Entomologica Africana Hors Série 3:1-32.

External links
ssp. diluta African Charaxes/Charaxes Africains Eric Vingerhoedt
ssp. amanica African Charaxes/Charaxes Africains Eric Vingerhoedt
African Charaxes/Charaxes Africains Eric Vingerhoedt images of eupale group
Charaxes dilutus dilutus images at Consortium for the Barcode of Life
Charaxes dilutus amanica images at BOLD
Charaxes dilutus kasitu images at BOLD
Charaxes dilutus veneris images at BOLD
Images of C. dilutus amanica Royal Museum for Central Africa (Albertine Rift Project)
Images of C. dilutus ngonga (Albertine Rift Project)
African Butterfly Database Range map via search (noting synonymy above on this page)

Butterflies described in 1898
dilutus
Butterflies of Africa
Taxa named by Walter Rothschild